Josh Zepnick (born March 21, 1968) is a former Democratic Party member of the Wisconsin State Assembly, representing the 9th Assembly District from 2003 until 2019.

Biography
Born in Milwaukee, Wisconsin, Zepnick received a bachelor's degree from the University of Wisconsin–Madison and a Masters in Public Policy from the University of Minnesota. He has worked for the Milwaukee Jobs Initiative, the Milwaukee Community Service Corps, the Urban Economic Development Association of Wisconsin, and the Center for Democracy and Citizenship, and has been an aide to Wisconsin State Senator Bob Jauch and Congressman David R. Obey.

Legislative career
Zepnick has served in the Wisconsin State Assembly since 2003. He has been the minority caucus sergeant at arms since 2011. He currently serves on the Committee on Energy and Utilities, the Committee on Financial Institutions, the Committee on Interstate Affairs, and the Committee on Ways and Means. Zepnick previously served on committees on State and  Federal Relations and State and Local Finance. He has served on Legislative Council Study Task Forces, the Governor's Council on Workforce Investment, and the Speaker's Task Force on Mental Health.

In 2009, Zepnick proposed a bill to require sobriety of bartenders and limit "all-you-can-drink" specials. In 2015, Zepnick admitted to drunk driving after he was arrested for a traffic violation in Greenfield, Wisconsin.

Allegations of misconduct 

In 2017, two women accused Zepnick of kissing them against their will at political events. Zepnick apologized and says the episodes should not prevent him from serving in the Assembly. He was eventually removed from legislative committee assignments.

Zepnick ran for re-election in 2018 but was defeated in the Democratic primary by Marisabel Cabrera.

County board race 
In April 2022, Zepnick was a candidate for the Milwaukee County board of supervisors. He lost his race by 17 votes to union organizer Juan Miguel Martinez. A challenge to the election results would have cost about $5,000, and Zepnick (who said he'd been sober now for about six and a half years) instead conceded, and wished Martinez well.

References

External links
Official government website
 
 Follow the Money - Josh Zepnick
2006 2004 2002 campaign contributions
Campaign 2008 campaign contributions at Wisconsin Democracy Campaign

1968 births
Living people
Politicians from Milwaukee
Humphrey School of Public Affairs alumni
University of Wisconsin–Madison alumni
21st-century American politicians
Democratic Party members of the Wisconsin State Assembly